The Wisconsin Department of Health Services (WisDHS) is a governmental agency of the U.S. state of Wisconsin responsible for maintaining public health. It administers a wide range of services in the state and at state institutions, regulates hospitals and care providers, and supervises and consults with local public health agencies. Its responsibilities include public health; mental health and substance abuse; long-term support and care; services to people with disabilities, medical assistance, and children’s services; aging programs; physical and developmental disability services; blindness disability programs; operation of care and treatment facilities; quality assurance programs; nutrition supplementation programs; medical assistance; and health care for low-income families, elderly, and the disabled.
 
It has primary responsibility for administering Medicaid and Medicare within the state. The DHS secretary is a cabinet member appointed by the Governor of Wisconsin and confirmed by the Wisconsin Senate.

The Wisconsin DHS is made up of three executive offices and five divisions organized according to function. WisDHS's main office is located in Madison, and it maintains regional offices throughout the state.

History
The Department of Health Services combines administration and supervision of many state and local 
functions that had developed separately in the 1800s.
In the early days of statehood, public health was primarily a function of local governments. For more than two decades after statehood, Wisconsin created separate governing boards and institutions for the care of prisoners; 
juveniles; and blind, deaf, and mentally ill persons. By 1871, there were six such institutions. 
The first attempt to institute overall state supervision of these services came in 1871 when the legislature created the State Board of Charities and Reform. Its duties 
included examination of the operations of state institutions and their boards and investigation of 
practices in local asylums, jails, and schools for the blind and deaf.

In 1876, the legislature established the State Board of Health to “study the 
vital statistics of this state, and endeavor to make intelligent and profitable use of the collected 
records of death and sickness among the people.” The board was directed to “make sanitary 
investigations and inquiries respecting the causes of disease, and especially of epidemics; the 
causes of mortality, and the effects of localities, employments, conditions, ingesta, habits and 
circumstances on the health of the people.” This directive still defines much of the work done in public health by the department. Later legislation required the board to take responsibility for tuberculosis care 
(1905),  preventing blindness in infants (1909), and to inspecting water 
and sewerage systems to prevent typhoid and dysentery (1919). In addition, the agency then licensed restaurants, health facilities, barbers, funeral directors and embalmers.

When the  federal government entered the field of public welfare during the Great Depression of the 1930s, Wisconsin had already pioneered a number of programs, including aid 
to children and pensions for the elderly (enacted in 1931). The Wisconsin Children’s Code, 
enacted in 1929, was considered one of the most comprehensive in the nation. The 
state’s initial response to the new federal funding was to establish separate departments to administer 
social security funds and other public welfare programs.

After several attempts at reorganization, the legislature established the Department of Public Welfare in 1939, to provide unified administration of all existing welfare functions. 
Public health and care for the aged were delegated to separate agencies.
The executive branch reorganization act of 1967 created the Department of Health and Social 
Services.  In addition to 
combining public welfare, public health, and care for the aged the Legislature added the Division of Vocational Rehabilitation. The  1960s and 1970s saw an expansion of public welfare and health services at both the federal and state levels. Notable were programs for medical care for the 
needy and aged (Medical Assistance and Medicare), drug treatment programs, food stamps, Aid 
to Families with Dependent Children Program (AFDC), and increased regulation of nursing homes and hospitals.

Rename and spin-off 
The Department of Health and Social Services was renamed the Department of Health and Family Services (DHFS), on July 1, 1996. In 2008, various programs of the DHFS were combined with others from the Wisconsin Department of Workforce Development, to create a new Wisconsin Department of Children and Families. The remaining health-specific programs were left under a renamed Department of Health Services.

Wisconsin DHS Divisions
 Division of Enterprise Services
 Division of Medicaid Services
 Division of Care and Treatment Services
 Division of Public Health
 Division of Quality Assurance
 Office of the Inspector General
 Office of Legal Counsel
 Office of Policy Initiatives and Budget
 Office of the Secretary

Notable people 
 Jasmine Zapata, chief medical officer and state epidemiologist for community health
 Andrea Palm, Secretary-designate of the Wisconsin Department of Health Services prior to her appointment as U.S. Deputy Secretary of Health and Human Services

References

External links

 

State departments of health of the United States
Health Services
Government agencies established in 2008
2008 establishments in Wisconsin
Medical and health organizations based in Wisconsin